Bo Mothander was a Swedish figure skater. Competing in single skating, he was a ten-time Swedish national champion, the 1946 Nordic champion, and placed 6th at the 1939 European Championships in Davos, Switzerland. He also competed in pair skating with Gun Ericson and Britta Råhlén. Råhlén/Mothander won seven consecutive national titles. In 1943, the pair had traveled to Berlin to perform at the Sportpalast when the city was bombed. They were not injured. Mothander competed in singles and pairs until 1946.

Competitive highlights

Single skating

Pair skating with Råhlén

Pair skating with Ericson

References 

Swedish male single skaters
Swedish male pair skaters
1900s births

Year of birth uncertain
Year of death missing